Jim Silye (born April 28, 1946) is a Canadian politician, businessman, and former professional football player for the Canadian Football League.

Born in Vöcklabruck, Austria, he emigrated to Arnprior, Ontario in 1951. He received a Bachelor of Arts degree from the University of Ottawa in 1969. He played on the Calgary Stampeders from 1969 to 1975, wearing numbers 28 and 33. He holds the CFL record for most punt returns in a season with 123. He was part of the 1971 Grey Cup-winning team.

In the 1993 Canadian federal election, he was elected as the Reform Party candidate in the riding of Calgary Centre. He  served one term and did not seek re-election in the 1997 election. He ran as a Progressive Conservative in the 2000 election in the riding of Calgary West, where he came second to incumbent MP Rob Anders of the Canadian Alliance, the successor party to Reform. In 2004, he ran in the Alberta Senate nominee election for a place in the Senate of Canada. He finished in fifth place, and was not put on the list of proposed Alberta senators.

He is the president and CEO of Eagle Rock Exploration Limited, an oil and gas exploration company based in Calgary, Alberta.

References

Notes

1946 births
Living people
Austrian emigrants to Canada
Calgary Stampeders players
Canadian football defensive backs
Canadian sportsperson-politicians
Candidates in the 2000 Canadian federal election
Members of the House of Commons of Canada from Alberta
Ottawa Gee-Gees football players
People from Arnprior, Ontario
People from Vöcklabruck
Players of Canadian football from Ontario
Politicians from Calgary
Progressive Conservative Party of Canada candidates for the Canadian House of Commons
Reform Party of Canada MPs